Susan Shapiro Barash is an American fiction and  nonfiction author. She writes fiction under her pen name Susannah Marren. Her novels include Between the Tides, A Palm Beach Wife, and A Palm Beach Scandal. Her nonfiction titles includes Tripping the Prom Queen: The Truth about Women and Rivalry, The Nine Phases of Marriage, and Little White Lies, Deep Dark Secrets: The Truth about Why Women Lie.

Career 
Barash's books focus on the gender divide, how women are positioned in American society and their feelings about themselves in different roles

Barash has been featured in The Wall Street Journal, The New York Post, New York Magazine, Elle, and many other publications.  She has appeared on national television including The Today Show, CBS, CNN, and MSNBC. Barash has been a guest on NPR and Sirius Radio and speaking appearances include Credit Suisse, Bayer Diagnostics, UBS, United Way, Kravis Center for the Arts and the Society of the Four Arts. Several of her titles have been optioned by Lifetime and HBO.

For over two decades Barash has taught in the Writing Department at Marymount Manhattan College. She has guest taught at the Writing Institute at Sarah Lawrence College and has served as a literary panelist for the New York State Council on the Arts. Barash has also been a judge for the International Emmys and Vice Chair of the Mentoring Committee of the Women's Leadership Board at the JFK School of Government, Harvard.

Books

Fiction 

 Between the Tides, St. Martin's Press (July 2015)  ISBN 978-1250066732
 A Palm Beach Wife, St. Martin's Griffin (April 2019) ISBN 978-1250198402
 A Palm Beach Scandal, Griffin (September 2020) ISBN 978-1250228086

Non-Fiction 

 The Nine Phases of Marriage, Griffin (September 2012) ISBN 978-0312642198
 You're Grounded Forever… But First Let's Go Shopping, St. Martin's Griffin (September 2010) ISBN 978-0312614225
 Toxic Friends, St. Martin's Press (October 2009) ISBN 978-0312386399
 Little White Lies, Deep Dark Secrets, St. Martin's Press (March 2008) ISBN 978-0312364458
 Tripping the Prom Queen: The Truth About Women and Rivalry,  St. Martin's Press (May 2006) ISBN 978-0312342319
 The New Wife: The Evolving Role of the American Wife, Nonetheless Pr (February 2004) ISBN 978-1932053081
 A Passion for More, Berkeley Hills Books (February 1993/reissue September 2003) ISBN 978-1893163249
 Women of Divorce: Mothers, Daughters, Stepmothers - The New Triangle, New Horizon Press (November 2002) ISBN 978-0882822228
 Mothers-in-Law and Daughters-In-Law: Love, Hate, Rivalry and Reconciliation, New Horizon Press (May 2001) ISBN 978-0882822068
 Reclaiming Ourselves: How Women Dispel a Legacy of Bad Choices, Berkeley Hills Books (December 2001) ISBN 978-1893163294
 Sisters: Devoted or Divided, Replica Books (1994/ reissue March 2001) ISBN 978-0735104846
 Second Wives: The Pitfalls and Rewards of Marrying Widowers and Divorced Men, New Horizon Press (May 2000) ISBN 978-0882821825

External links 

 Susan Shapiro Barash website

References 

Living people
1954 births
American women novelists
American women non-fiction writers
New York University alumni
Sarah Lawrence College alumni
Marymount Manhattan College faculty
American women academics
21st-century American women